Laurence Andre Arico (born December 21, 1969) is a former American football coach. He served as the head football coach at Fairleigh Dickinson University–Florham (FDU) from 1997 to 1999 and William Paterson University (WPU) from 2000 to 2004, compiling a career college football coaching record of an overall record of 16–64. Arico was the athletic director and football coach at Marist High School in Bayonne, New Jersey.

Arico is the husband of Kim Barnes Arico, the head women's basketball coach at the University of Michigan.

Arico grew up in Mount Arlington, New Jersey and attended Pope John XXIII Regional High School in Sparta, New Jersey, where he played football, basketball and ran track. He attended Lehigh University and was a four-year varsity letter winner in football at Lehigh University as a running back.

Arico was a resident of Teaneck, New Jersey while coaching at William Paterson and has since been a resident of Glen Rock, New Jersey.

Head coaching record

College

References

External links
 William Paterson profile

1969 births
Living people
Fairleigh Dickinson–Florham Devils football coaches
Lehigh Mountain Hawks football players
William Paterson Pioneers football coaches
High school football coaches in New Jersey
People from Glen Rock, New Jersey
People from Mount Arlington, New Jersey
People from Teaneck, New Jersey
Sportspeople from Morris County, New Jersey
Players of American football from New Jersey